The Whistles & The Bells is an American experimental alt-rock band based in Nashville, Tennessee, that serves as a moniker for singer-songwriter and producer Bryan Simpson. The band has released two full-length studio albums: The Whistles & The Bells in 2015, and Modern Plagues in 2017.
Their music makes use of elements from rock, pop, folk, and electronic genres.

Formation
Singer-songwriter Bryan Simpson began the Whistles & the Bells as a solo musical venture, which he says was inspired by a spiritual awakening in 2008. He described the project as an "autobiographical snapshot" of his personal struggle in seeking understanding of a divine creator, or his personal truth about such a being.

For the band's original lineup, Simpson brought in Matt Menefee and Ross Holmes, members of his previous project, progressive bluegrass band Cadillac Sky, with which he had released three albums.

The Whistles & The Bells
Simpson self-released the band's eponymous debut album in 2014. On August 7, 2015, the album was reissued globally by New West Records. It was recorded at Sputnik Sound by Grammy Award-winning engineer Vance Powell, and Eddie Spear. All songs were written by Simpson except "Ghost Town" and "Ghetto Gold" (Simpson and Thad Cokrell), and "Last Night God Sang Me a Song" (Ben Kyle and Simpson).

Personnel
 Bryan Simpson – vocals, acoustic and electric guitars, mandolin, fiddle
 Matthew Menefee – banjo, mandolin, six-string
 Melvin "Maestro" Lightford – organ, upright piano
 Byron House – upright and electric bass
 Adam Stockdale – electric guitar
 Keio Stroud, Chris Powell, Billy Brimblecom – drums
 "Fats" Kaplin – steel guitar
 Rob Ickes – dobro
 Kai Welch – trumpet
 Jim Hoke – sax
 Ross Holmes – violin
 Nat Smith – cello
 Jeff Taylor – accordion
 Eddie Spear – double gong
 Kristen Rogers, Thad Cockrell, Phoebe Deffenbaugh - backing vocals
 The Doberman Region aka "Crisco and Boots," Edward Spear - additional vocals

The Stars in My Sky Choir:
 Kristi Simpson, Nathan Meredith, Matt and Brittany Jenkins, Brent Rupard, Nathan Belt, Doctor Proctor, Taylor Jones, Bruno and Caitie Jones, Aaron Mandalak, Gary and Debra Sadler

 Produced by B. Simpson
 Engineering: Vance Powell, Eddie Spear, Ben Phillips, Matt Gordon
 Mixing Engineer: Vance Powell, Eddie Spear
 Mastered by: Chris Athens

Modern Plagues
The band's second album, Modern Plagues, was released on April 28, 2017, by New West Records. The album features collaborations with The Raconteurs' Brendan Benson and Matt Menefee. Eddie Spear engineered and co-produced the album with Simpson. Simpson described his intention as trying to create the sound of a "cosmic dinner party".

Personnel
 Bryan Simpson – vocals, guitar, mandolin
 Matt Menefee – banjo, electric guitar, synth, piano, mandocello
 Brooke Waggoner – piano, organ, synth
 Royal Masat – electric and upright bass
 Adam Stockdale – electric guitar
 Dave Jackson – drums
 Chris Powell – drums on "Spiral Staircase"
 Eddie Spear – hookah on "Harry Potter," tambourine and animal drums on "Zombie Heartz"
 Jon Estes – electric bass on "Year of the Freak Out" and "40 Years"
 John Painter – horns
 Timbre – harp
 Eli Bishop & Tyler Andal – violins
 Emily Nelson – cello
 Tyler Summers – flute, clarinet
 Phoebe Cryar – featured lead on "Supadope"
 Phoebe Cryar, Callie Cryar Pittman, Doberman Region Act 2 – background vocals on "Head in the Sand", Uncle Buffalo

 Produced by: Eddie Spear and Bryan Simpson
 Recorded by: Eddie Spear at Sound Emporium – Nashville, TN; "Spiral Staircase" recorded at Omni Studios, Nashville, TN
 Assistant Engineer: Zach Pancoast, Jordan Harrell, Logan Yandell
 Mixed by: Eddie Spear
 Mastered by: Chris Athens at Chris Athens Mastering, Austin, TX
 Management: Santo Pullella at Head West Management

References

External links
 

American alternative rock groups
Musical groups from Nashville, Tennessee
Musical groups established in 2008